Politics in Georgia involve a parliamentary representative democratic republic with a multi-party system. The President of Georgia is the ceremonial head of state and the Prime Minister of Georgia is the head of government. The Prime Minister and the Government wield executive power. Legislative power is vested in both the Government and the unicameral Parliament of Georgia.

The Georgian state is highly centralized, except for the autonomous regions of Abkhazia and Adjara and the former autonomous region of South Ossetia. Abkhazia and South Ossetia, which had autonomy within the Georgian SSR during Soviet rule, unilaterally seceded from Georgia in the 1990s. While, the Georgian government recognizes Abkhazia as autonomous within Georgia, it does not recognize South Ossetia as having any special status.

Developments in 2003-2008
Following a crisis involving allegations of ballot fraud in the 2003 parliamentary elections, Eduard Shevardnadze resigned as president on November 23, 2003, in the bloodless Rose Revolution. The interim president was the speaker of the outgoing parliament (whose replacement was annulled), Nino Burjanadze. On January 4, 2004 Mikheil Saakashvili, leader of the United National Movement won the country's presidential election and was inaugurated on January 25.

Fresh parliamentary elections were held on March 28, 2004, where the United National Movement's parliamentary faction, the National Movement - Democrats (NMD), secured the vast majority of the seats (with ca. 75% of the votes).  Only one other party reached the 7% threshold: the Rightist Opposition with ca. 7.5%. The vote is believed to have been one of the freest ever held in independent Georgia although an upsurge of tension between the central government and the Ajarian leader Aslan Abashidze affected the elections in this region. Despite recognizing progress the Organization for Security and Co-operation in Europe noted the tendency to misuse state administration resources in favor of the ruling party.

Tensions between Georgia and separatist authorities in Ajaria increased after the elections, climaxing on May 1, 2004 when Abashidze responded to military maneuvers held by Georgia near the region by having the three bridges connecting Ajaria and the rest of Georgia over the Choloki River blown up. On May 5, Abashidze was forced to flee Georgia as mass demonstrations in Batumi called for his resignation and Russia increased their pressure by deploying Security Council secretary Igor Ivanov.

On February 3, 2005, Prime Minister Zurab Zhvania died of carbon monoxide poisoning in an apparent gas leak at the home of Raul Usupov, deputy governor of Kvemo Kartli region. Later, Zhvania's close friend and a long-time ally, Finance Minister Zurab Nogaideli was appointed for the post by President Saakashvili.

Under the Saakasvili administration Georgia has achieved considerable progress in eradicating corruption. In 2008 Transparency International ranked Georgia 67th in its Corruption Perceptions Index, with a score of 3.9 points out of 10 possible. This represents the best result among the CIS countries and a dramatic improvement on Georgia's score in 2004, when the country was ranked 133rd with 2.0 points.

Georgia also strengthened fight against the thieves-in-law. In December 2005 Georgian criminal code was reorganized to charge the criminal authorities with aggravating circumstances. Abuses of human rights were revealed in Georgian prisons after the 2012 Gldani prison scandal as prisoners had been permanently tortured and beaten by the penal servants. The further investigation revealed the head of Penitentiary Department of Ministry of Justice of Georgia Bachana Akhalaia was the one who had been managing the process of torturing the prisoners.

In June 2004 the prominent Georgian tycoon Kakha Bendukidze was called by the president Mikheil Saakashvili to hold position of Minister of Economy. Kakha Bendukidze was known as a committed right-wing libertarian, who supported the Laissez-faire, deregulation of market and low taxes. Under his terms of ministerial office the thoroughgoing reformation was onset. The taxes were significantly lowered and privatisation was restarted. As a result, Georgia became one of the most favourable country in the world to start investing in. It resulted in the high growth of GDP. Nevertheless, economic growth was not able to fully settle the problems of unemployment and one-fourth of the nation living under the poverty rate.

In January 2006 a new party, Georgia's Way, was created. The movement is led by former Foreign Minister Salome Zourabichvili, and appears to be relatively popular. An opinion poll conducted by the Georgian weekly Kviris Palitra and published on April 10, 2006 suggested that Salome Zourabichvili would garner 23.1% of votes if a presidential election were held today. President Saakashvili ranked first with 33% - an all-time low for the Georgian President - whilst no other individual managed to surpass double-digit levels of support. Georgia's Way has said it intends to have candidates for all the seats in Georgia's upcoming local elections, with Zourabichvili hoping to become Tbilisi Mayor.

On November 7, 2007, during a period of mass protests, President Saakashvili declared Tbilisi to be in a state of emergency. There were massive demonstrations and protests by the civil opposition, demanding the resignation of President Saakashvili. The Georgian police used teargas, batons, water cannons and high tech acoustic weapons in the streets of Tbilisi. Later that day, the President declared a state of emergency in the whole country of Georgia. The Russian government denied accusations of being involved or of interfering in the situation. President Saakashvili rejected all demands that he resign his position, but announced early presidential elections to be held in January 2008, effectively cutting his term in office by a year.

On November 16, 2007, Prime Minister of Georgia Zurab Noghaideli announced his resignation due to poor health conditions. Noghaideli underwent heart operation in April 2007 at St. Luke's Episcopal Hospital in Houston, Texas, which was led by the leading U.S. surgeon Dr. Charles Frazier.

President Saakashvili invited Vladimer ("Lado") Gurgenidze, MBA holder from Emory University, United States and former business executive, to succeed Noghaideli on the position of the PM on the same day. Gurgenidze was formally approved on the position and granted the trust of the Parliament of Georgia on November 22, 2007. Gurgenidze implemented only two changes in the Cabinet of Georgia so far, replacing Alexandre Lomaia, the former Minister for Education and Science and new Secretary of National Security Council with Maia Miminoshvili, former Head of the National Assessment and Examination Centre (NAEC).  Prime Minister also invited Koba Subeliani, former Head of Municipal Accomplishment Service to succeed Giorgi Kheviashvili, former Minister for Refugees and Accommodation. New Prime Minister and two Ministers Koba Subeliani and Maia Miminoshvili were approved on their positions on November 22, 2007 by a confidence vote of the Parliament of Georgia.

Mikheil Saakashvili resigned from the position of the President on November 25, 2007 as the Constitution of Georgia requires the president stands down at least 45 days before the next election to be eligible for retaking part him/herself. The Speaker of the Parliament of Georgia Mrs. Nino Burjanadze took over the position until the results were announced on January 5, 2008.

Twenty-two people registered for the presidential elections, including the most recent president Mikheil Saakashvili, approved candidate of the united opposition Levan Gachechiladze, influential businessman Badri Patarkatsishvili, Leader of the New Right Party David Gamkrelidze, the Leader of the Georgian Labour Party Shalva Natelashvili, the Leader of Hope Party Irina Sarishvili-Chanturia and Giorgi Maisashvili.

Since 2012 
On 26 May 2012, Saakashvili inaugurated a new Parliament building in the western city of Kutaisi, in an effort to decentralize power and shift some political control closer to Abkhazia. In preparation for 2012 parliamentary elections, Parliament adopted a new electoral code on 27 December 2011 that incorporated many recommendations from non-governmental organizations (NGOs) and the Venice Commission. However, the new code failed to address the Venice Commission's primary recommendation to strengthen the equality of the vote by reconstituting single-mandate election districts to be comparable in size. On 28 December, Parliament amended the Law on Political Unions to regulate campaign and political party financing. Local and international observers raised concerns about several amendments, including the vagueness of the criteria for determining political bribery and which individuals and organizations would be subject to the law. , Parliament was discussing further amendments to address these concerns.

The elections in October 2012 resulted in the victory for the opposition "Georgian Dream – Democratic Georgia" coalition, which President Saakashvili acknowledged on the following day.

Since 2012, politics in Georgia has been dominated by a confrontation between the two main political parties, Georgian Dream (GD) and the United National Movement (UNM), and their respective founders and de facto leaders, Bidzina Ivanishvili and Mikheil Saakashvili. 

In October 2013, Giorgi Margvelashvili, a member Georgian Dream party, won presidential election, ushering in the former Soviet republic's first legal transfer of power. He succeeded President Mikheil Saakashvili, who had served the maximum two terms since coming to power in the bloodless 2003 "Rose Revolution"

In October 2016, the ruling party, Georgian Dream, won the parliamentary election with  48.61 percent of the vote and the opposition United National Movement (UNM) 27.04 percent. Georgian Dream came to power in 2012, ending UNM’s nine-year rule. It was funded by tycoon Bidzina Ivanishvili, the country’s richest man and party chief, while the opposition UNM was founded by former president Mikheil Saakashvili.

In November 2018, Salome Zurabishvili won Georgia's presidential election, becoming the first woman to hold the office. She was backed by the ruling Georgian Dream party. However, the new constitution made the role of president largely ceremonial. It was the last direct election of a Georgian president, as the country switched to a parliamentary system.

On 31 October 2020, the ruling Georgian Dream, led by Bidzina Ivanishvili, secured over 48% of votes in the parliamentary election. It gave the party the right to form the country's next government and continue governing alone. The opposition made accusations of fraud, which the Georgian Dream denied. Thousands of people gathered outside the Central Election Commission to demand a new vote.

In February 2021, Irakli Garibashvili became Prime Minister of Georgia, following the resignation of Prime Minister Giorgi Gakharia. Prime Minister  Irakli Garibashviliis, who had an earlier term as prime minister in 2013-15, is a close ally of the powerful founder of the ruling Georgian Dream party, Bidzina Ivanishvili.

On 1 October 2021, former President Mikheil Saakashvili was arrested on his return from exile. Saakashvili led the country from 2004 to 2013 but was later convicted in absentia on corruption charges, which he denied.

Monarchist option
Consideration of replacing Georgia's republic with some form of constitutional monarchy has become part of Georgian political debate since the Catholicos-Patriarch Ilia II and other leading Georgians suggested the idea in 2007. The patriarch said that restoration of the Bagrationi royal family was a "desirable dream of the Georgian people". He also emphasized that if the people of Georgia chose this model of governance, "a candidate to the crown should be selected among representatives of the royal dynasty, and he should be suitably raised to be king from childhood."

Competition arose among the old dynasty's princes and supporters, as historians and jurists debated which Bagrationi has the strongest hereditary right to a throne that has been vacant for two centuries. Although some Georgian monarchists support the Gruzinsky branch's claim, others support that of the re-patriated Mukhrani branch. Both branches descend in unbroken, legitimate male line from the medieval kings of Georgia down to Constantine II of Georgia who died in 1505.

David Bagration of Mukhrani, married Ana Bagration-Gruzinsky on 8 February 2009 at the Tbilisi Sameba Cathedral. The marriage united the Gruzinsky and Mukhrani branches of the former Georgian royal family, and drew a crowd of 3,000 spectators, officials, and foreign diplomats, as well as extensive coverage by the Georgian media.

Euro-Atlantic Integration

Since 1990s, Georgia's leaders declared an ambition to join Euroatlantic institutions, a process that began with Georgia’s accession to the Council of Europe in 1999. The speaker of the Georgian Parliament, Zurab Zhvania, at the Parliamentary Assembly of the Council of Europe, declared that: "I am Georgian and therefore I am European". In 2002, then president of Georgia Eduard Shevardnadze first applied to join NATO. After the Rose Revolution new president of Georgia Mikheil Saakashvili promoted closer ties with western institutions including NATO and EU. The government has created a Ministry for European and Euro-Atlantic Integration, which was dissolved on 22 December 2017 after passing constitutional amendments by Georgian Parliament. On 5 January 2008 alongside Georgian presidential elections was held non-binding referendum on joining NATO. 77% of total number of voters supported integration of Georgia into NATO. Within NATO, Georgia is currently in Intensified Dialogue.

In 2014 Georgia signed an Association Agreement with the EU, deepening political and economic ties in the framework of the Eastern Partnership.

In June 2021, government of Georgia presented a 10-year development plan, stressing the country's aims to officially apply for EU membership in 2024. As a result of the outbreak of the Russo-Ukrainian war on 24 February 2022 and renewed talks about Georgia's aspiration to join the Euro-Atlantic institutions, on 3 March 2022, Prime Minister Irakli Garibashvili signed the letter with which the country officially applied for the European Union candidate status at an accelerated pace.

Political conditions

The Abkhaz separatist dispute absorbs much of the government's attention. While a cease-fire is in effect about 250,000 internally displaced persons (IDPs) who were driven from their homes during the conflict, constitute a vocal lobby. The government has offered the region considerable autonomy to encourage a settlement that would allow the IDPs (mainly ethnic Georgians from the Gali district) to return home, however the Abkhaz side refused to accept it.

Currently, Russian peacekeepers are stationed in Abkhazia under the authority of the Commonwealth of Independent States, along with United Nations observers but both groups have recently had to restrict their activities due to increased mining and guerrilla . So far (by 2007) the negotiations have not resulted in any settlement. France, United Kingdom, Germany, Russia and the United States (who act as the members of the United Nations and the OSCE) continue to encourage a comprehensive settlement consistent with Georgian independence, sovereignty, and territorial integrity. The UN observer force and other organizations are quietly encouraging grassroots cooperative and confidence-building measures in the region.

The parliament has instituted wide-ranging political reforms supportive of higher human rights standards, because between 1992 and 2003 (before the Rose Revolution of November 23, 2003) the Georgian human rights situation had been complicated. Despite the reforms by the new government, there are still numerous problems concerning respect for human rights in the country. Prisoners are frequently maltreated, journalists are intimidated by the authorities and much of the mainstream media is owned by government supporters. The police are often accused of planting evidence, beatings and the unnecessary killing of suspects.

Executive branch
The President is a ceremonial head of state and exercises no executive powers. The government and prime minister are appointed by and answer only to the Parliament. The President is appointed indirectly by a parliamentary electoral college, consisting of Members of Parliament and local regional legislators.

|President
|Salome Zourabichvili
| -
|16 December 2018
|-
|Prime Minister
|Irakli Garibashvili
|Georgian Dream
|22 February 2021
|}

Legislative branch

The Parliament of Georgia (Sak'art'velos Parlamenti) has 150 members, elected for a four-year term.

Current Speaker of Parliament is Shalva Papuashvili.

Political parties and elections

Latest elections

Parliamentary elections

Presidential elections

Judicial branch
Georgia has a Supreme Court, with judges elected by the Parliament on the president's recommendation, and a Constitutional Court.

Administrative divisions

Georgia is divided into 2 autonomous republics (avtonomiuri respublika), 9 region (mkhare), and a capital territory.
Autonomous republics: Abkhazia, Ajaria.
Mkhares: Guria, Imereti, Kakheti, Kvemo Kartli, Mtskheta-Mtianeti, Racha-Lechkhumi and Kvemo Svaneti, Samegrelo-Zemo Svaneti, Samtskhe-Javakheti, Shida Kartli.
Capital city: Tbilisi
The regions and autonomous republics are subdivided into 67 municipalities (Georgian: მუნიციპალიტეტი; before 2006 - raioni, Georgian: რაიონი) and cities with local government:
Cities: Batumi, Kutaisi, Poti, Rustavi, Tbilisi, Tskhinvali.
Districts: Abasha, Adigeni, Akhalgori, Akhalkalaki, Akhaltsikhe, Akhmeta, Ambrolauri, Aspindza, Baghdati, Bolnisi, Borjomi, Chiatura, Chkhorotsku, Chokhatauri, Dedoplistsqaro, Dmanisi, Dusheti, Gagra, Gali, Gardabani, Gori, Gudauta, Gulripshi, Gurjaani, Java, Kareli, Kaspi, Kazbegi, Keda, Kharagauli, Khashuri, Khelvachauri, Khobi, Khoni, Khulo, Kobuleti, Lagodekhi, Lanchkhuti, Lentekhi, Marneuli, Martvili, Mestia, Mtskheta, Ninotsminda, Ochamchire, Oni, Ozurgeti, Qvareli, Sachkhere, Sagarejo, Samtredia, Senaki, Shuakhevi, Sighnaghi, Sukhumi, Telavi, Terjola, Tetritsqaro, Tianeti, Tkibuli, Tsageri, Tsalenjikha, Tsalka, Tskaltubo, Vani, Zestaponi, Zugdidi

note: administrative divisions have the same names as their administrative centers (exceptions have the administrative center name following in parentheses)

Local government

 Tbilisi City Assembly
 Kutaisi City Assembly
 Batumi City Assembly
 Rustavi City Assembly
 Poti City Assembly

International organization participation
BSEC, Council of Europe, EAPC, EBRD, ECE, FAO, GUAM, IAEA, IBRD, ICAO, International Chamber of Commerce, International Criminal Court (ICC), ITUC, IDA, IFAD, IFC, IFRCS, ILO, IMF, International Maritime Organization, Inmarsat, Interpol, IOC, IOM, ISO (correspondent), ITU, OAS (observer), OPCW, OSCE, PFP, United Nations, UNCTAD, UNESCO, UNIDO, UPU, WCO, WHO, WIPO, WMO, WTO

See also

Human rights in Georgia (country)
Rose Revolution
Monarchism in Georgia
Liberalism in Georgia
State Procurement Agency (Georgia)

References

Further reading
 Mataradze, Teona; Mühlfried, Florian: "Leaving and Being Left Behind: Labor Migration in Georgia" in the Caucasus Analytical Digeast No. 4
 Organized Crime and Illegal Trafficking in the Caucasus. Articles in the Caucasus Analytical Digest No. 9
 Cooley, Alexander; Mitchell, Lincoln: "Georgia: The Interconnections between Democracy and Security" in the Caucasus Analytical Digest No. 17
 Anti-Corruption Reforms in Georgia. Articles in the Caucasus Analytical Digest No. 26

External links
 Erik Herron's Guide to Politics of East Central Europe and Eurasia